Habib Ahmadzadeh is an Iranian author novelist and scriptwriter, born in 1963 in Abadan. The Iran–Iraq War features heavily in his work, with observations of human existence and human interactions in wartime informed by his own wartime service. During the war he rose from being a teenage  volunteer Basiji militiaman to become a captain in the regular army.

He earned a BA in Dramatic Literature from Tehran Art University and a PhD in Art Research from Tarbiat Modares University.

Career
In 1998, he began his career in cinema as a script editor with Ebrahim Hatamikia at The Glass Agency, and in 2007, he received the Iranian House of Cinema award for best screenplay for The Night Bus. He has filmed a number of documentaries over his career, the most recent of which, The Outstanding Statue in the World, earned the Tehran Cinema Verite Festival prize for best documentary in 2012.
Habib Ahmadzadeh has also been an influential youth advocate in Iran.

Works
 A City Under Siege: Tales of the Iran–Iraq War(Bibliotheca Iranica Persian Fiction in Translation Series), 2010 
 Chess with the Doomsday Machine, 2008

Awards and recognition
 Jalal Al-e Ahmad Literary Awards,2020; Forty Years of Sacred Defense Fiction,  a category intended to recognize the authors of the most important war stories written during the last four decades.
 Iranian House of Cinema award
 Tehran Cinema Verite Festival prize for best documentary, 2012
 Jury Fajr International Film Festival, 2018

See also
 Belgrade fair offers Serbian translation of Persian novel “Chess with the Doomsday Machine”
 Author Habib Ahmadzadeh Tehran Times
  (Review of Chess with the Doomsday)
  (Review of A City Under Siege)

References

External links/references
 Habib Ahmadzadeh at IMDb
  Habib Ahmadzadeh at Asia Pacific Screen Awards
 Habib Ahmadzadeh, Open Democracy
 Habib Ahmadzadeh's profile
 Ahmadzadeh's list of published books
 Habib Ahmadzadeh, WorldCat
 Tag Archives for: Iran-Iraq war

Living people
Iranian writers
Volunteer Basij personnel of the Iran–Iraq War
Iranian male short story writers
Year of birth missing (living people)